Peter Clay Carroll (born September 15, 1951) is an American football coach who is the head coach and executive vice president for the Seattle Seahawks of the National Football League (NFL). He was previously the head football coach at USC from 2000 to 2009, where he won six bowl games and back to back National Championships in 2003 and 2004.

Beginning his head coaching career on the professional level, Carroll saw minimal success with the New York Jets in 1994 and some success with the New England Patriots from 1997 to 1999. Shifting to college football with USC, he revitalized the struggling program into a top-ranked contender. Carroll's collegiate success prompted an NFL return in 2010 when he was hired as the head coach of Seattle. Under Carroll, the Seahawks have qualified for the playoffs nine times, clinched their division five times, made two consecutive Super Bowl appearances, and won the franchise's first championship in Super Bowl XLVIII over the Denver Broncos. The team's Legion of Boom defense also led the league in scoring for four consecutive seasons during his tenure. Carroll is one of four head coaches (alongside Paul Brown, Jimmy Johnson and Barry Switzer) to win a college football national championship and an NFL championship.

Early life
Carroll was born on September 15, 1951, in San Francisco, California, the son of Rita (née Ban) and James Edward "Jim" Carroll. Two of his paternal great-grandparents were Irish immigrants, and his Croatian maternal grandparents emigrated from around the region of Šibenik. He was raised in Greenbrae, California and attended Greenbrae School. Carroll attended Redwood High School in Larkspur, California.

He was a multi-sport star in football (playing quarterback, wide receiver, and defensive back), basketball, and baseball, earning the school's Athlete of the Year honors as a senior in 1969. He was inducted into the charter class of the Redwood High School Athletic Hall of Fame in April 2009.

Career
After high school, Carroll attended junior college at the nearby College of Marin, where he played football for two years (lettering in his second year) before transferring to the University of the Pacific, where he was a member of Sigma Alpha Epsilon fraternity. At Pacific, Carroll played free safety for two years for the Tigers, earning All-Pacific Coast Athletic Conference honors both years (1971–72) and earning his Bachelor of Science in Business Administration in 1973.

After graduation, Carroll tried out for the Honolulu Hawaiians of the World Football League at their training camp in Riverside but did not make the team due to shoulder problems combined with his small size.

Collegiate assistant (1973–1983)
Carroll's energetic and positive personality made a good impression on his head coach, Chester Caddas. When Caddas found out Carroll was interested in coaching, he offered him a job as a graduate assistant on his staff at Pacific. Carroll agreed and enrolled as a graduate student, earning a secondary teaching credential and Master's degree in physical education in 1976, while serving as a graduate assistant for three years and working with the wide receivers and secondary defenders. The assistants at Pacific during this time included a number of other future successful coaches, including Greg Robinson, Jim Colletto, Walt Harris, Ted Leland, and Bob Cope. Carroll was inducted into the Pacific Athletic Hall of Fame in 1995.

After graduating from Pacific, Carroll's colleague Bob Cope was hired by the University of Arkansas and he convinced Lou Holtz, then the head coach of the Razorbacks, to also hire Carroll. Carroll spent the 1977 season as a graduate assistant working with the secondary under Cope. During his season with Arkansas, he met his future offensive line coach Pat Ruel, also a graduate assistant, as well as the future head coach of the Razorbacks Houston Nutt, who was a backup quarterback. Arkansas' Defensive Coordinator at the time, Monte Kiffin, would be a mentor to Carroll.  The Razorbacks won the 1978 Orange Bowl that season.

The following season, Carroll moved to Iowa State University, where he was again an assistant working on the secondary under Earle Bruce. When Bruce moved on to Ohio State University, he again hired Carroll to coach the secondary. The Ohio State squad made it to the 1980 Rose Bowl where they lost to USC.

When Monte Kiffin was named head coach of North Carolina State University in 1980, he brought Carroll in as his defensive coordinator and secondary coach. In 1983, Bob Cope became head coach of Pacific and brought Carroll on as assistant head coach and offensive coordinator.

National Football League (1984–1999)
Carroll left Pacific after a year and entered the NFL in 1984 as the defensive backs coach of the Buffalo Bills. The next year, he moved on to work with the Minnesota Vikings, where he held a similar position for five seasons (1985–89). In 1989, he was a candidate for the head coaching position at Stanford University; the position went to Dennis Green. His success with the Vikings led to his hiring by the New York Jets, where he served as defensive coordinator under Bruce Coslet for four seasons (1990–93). Carroll and Coslet had known each other for many years by that time, as Carroll's older brother was Coslet's college roommate. When there was an opening for the Vikings' head coach position in 1992, he was a serious candidate but lost the position, again to Green.

In 1994, Carroll was elevated to Head Coach of the Jets. Known for his energy and youthful enthusiasm, Carroll painted a basketball court in the parking lot of the team's practice facility where he and his assistant coaches regularly played three-on-three games during their spare time. The Jets got off to a 6–5 start under Carroll, but in Week 12, he was the victim of Dan Marino's "clock play"—a fake spike that became a Miami Dolphins game-winning touchdown. The Jets lost all of their remaining games to finish 6–10. He was fired after one season.

Carroll was hired for the next season by the San Francisco 49ers, where he served as defensive coordinator for the following two seasons (1995–96). His return to success as the defensive coordinator led to his hiring as the head coach of the New England Patriots in 1997, replacing coach Bill Parcells, who had resigned after disputes with the team's ownership. His 1997 Patriots team won the AFC East division title, but his subsequent two teams did not fare as well—losing in the wild card playoff round in 1998, and missing the playoffs after a late-season slide in 1999—and he was fired after the 1999 season. Patriots owner Robert Kraft said firing Carroll was one of the toughest decisions he has had to make since buying the team, stating, "A lot of things were going on that made it difficult for him to stay, some of which were out of his control. And it began with following a legend." His combined NFL record as a head coach was 33–31, and he was later considered a much better fit for college football than the NFL after his success at USC.

Even though several NFL teams approached him with defensive coordinator positions, Carroll instead spent the 2000 season as a consultant for pro and college teams, doing charitable work for the NFL, and writing a column about pro football for CNNSI.com.

USC Trojans (2000–2009)

Hiring

Carroll was named the Trojans' head coach on December 15, 2000, signing a five-year contract after USC had gone through a tumultuous 18-day search to replace fired coach Paul Hackett. He was not the Trojans' first choice, and was considered a long shot as the USC Athletic Department under Director Mike Garrett initially planned to hire a high-profile coach with recent college experience. Meanwhile, Carroll, who had not coached in over a year and not coached in the college ranks since 1983, drew unfavorable comparisons to the outgoing Hackett.

USC first pursued then-Oregon State coach Dennis Erickson, who instead signed a contract extension with the Beavers; then Oregon coach Mike Bellotti, who similarly signed an extension. The search then moved to the San Diego Chargers coach Mike Riley, who had been an assistant coach at USC before later becoming the head coach of Oregon State. Stuck in contractual obligations to the Chargers (who were still in the midst of an NFL season) and hesitant about moving his family, Riley was unable to give a firm answer, opening an opportunity for Carroll, the school's fourth choice.

Carroll actively pursued the position, as his daughter, Jaime, was then a player on the school's successful volleyball team. After the first three primary candidates turned down the position, USC hired Carroll. Under Garrett, USC had tried to recruit Carroll to be their head coach in 1997, while he was coaching the Patriots, but Carroll was unable to take the position. The second time the opening came up, Daryl Gross, then senior associate athletic director for USC, recommended Carroll to Garrett based on his experience as a former scout for the New York Jets while Carroll coached there. Garrett cited Carroll's intelligence, energy and reputation as a defensive specialist as reasons for his hire.

The choice of Carroll for USC's head coaching position was openly criticized by the media and many USC fans, primarily because of USC's stagnation under the outgoing Hackett and Carroll's record as a head coach in the NFL and being nearly two decades removed from the college level. Garrett took particular criticism for the hire, with the press tying his future with Carroll's after he had to fire two head coaches in four years for USC's premiere athletic coaching position. Former NFL players (including USC alumni) such as Ronnie Lott, Gary Plummer, Tim McDonald and Willie McGinest offered their support for Carroll, who they noted had a player-friendly, easygoing style that might suit the college game and particularly recruiting. The USC Athletic Department received 2,500 e-mails, faxes and phone calls from alumni—mostly critical—and a number of donors asking for Carroll's removal before they would donate again.

Within a year of his hiring, many prominent critics reversed course. In 2008, ESPN.com named Carroll's hiring number 1 in a list of the Pac-10's top ten moments of the BCS era.

Tenure
The criticism of Carroll became louder when Carroll's first USC team opened the 2001 season going 2–5, with some sportswriters writing off the once-dominant Trojans, who were the only Pac-10 football team to never finish in the national top 10 during the previous decade, as a dying program. However, after the slow start, Carroll's teams proceeded to go 67–7 over the next 74 games, winning two national championships and playing for another.

Carroll was considered one of the most effective recruiters in college football, having brought in multiple top-ranked recruiting classes; he was also known for getting commitments from nationally prominent players early in high school. His son, Brennan Carroll, was USC's recruiting coordinator as well as the tight ends coach during the elder Carroll's tenure as head coach. He had consistently been on the forefront of recruiting due to his ability to connect with potential players on their level, including becoming the first college coach with a Facebook page, as well as an early adopter of Twitter.

Carroll's team won a then-school record 34 straight games from 2003 to 2005, a streak that started after a triple-overtime loss to California and ended with the national championship game against the Texas Longhorns in the 2006 Rose Bowl. Fourteen of those games were later vacated for breaking NCAA rules. During his tenure, USC broke its average home attendance record four times in a row (they play at the Los Angeles Memorial Coliseum); the USC home attendance average in 2001, his first season, was 57,744; by 2006, it was over 91,000. During this period, USC had a 35-game winning streak at the Coliseum, spanning 6 years (2001-2007). The streak began on October 13, 2001, with a 48-17 win over the  Arizona State Sun Devils and the final victory  was a 47-14 win over the Washington State Cougars on September 22, 2007. The streak ended on October 6, 2007, with a 24–23 loss to the Stanford Cardinal who was a 41-point underdog. Prior to this the last loss was on September 29, 2001, (during Carroll's first year) to Stanford Cardinal 21-16. The success of USC football under Carroll led to a sharp rise in overall athletic department revenue, growing from $38.6 million in Carroll's first season at USC to more than $76 million in 2007–08.

Controversy arose when USC was excluded from the National Championship Game for the 2003 season, even though ranked #1 in both the Associated Press (AP) Poll and the ESPN/USA Today Coaches Poll. Years later, (2008) he was asked if winning the Rose Bowl was ever not enough. "No. You've got to understand that our mindset is to focus only on what we can control. We can only control getting to the Rose Bowl. Winning our conference and going to the Rose Bowl is what our goal is every year. Our goal isn't about national championships, because we don't have control of that -- that's in somebody else's hands. We found that out years ago [2003], when we were No. 1 but then we were No. 3. We already knew that but that just proved it. If we win our games and we're out there and they want us to go somewhere else, then we'll go. We love the Rose Bowl."

Carroll was repeatedly approached regarding vacant head coach positions in the NFL beginning in 2002. Carroll hesitated to return to the NFL after his previous experiences, and said that his return would likely rest on control over personnel matters at a level unprecedented in the league. He had insisted over the years that he was happy at USC and that money was not an issue; he also was said to enjoy the Southern California lifestyle. When asked if he would retire at USC, Carroll responded:

When originally hired, Carroll signed a five-year contract worth approximately $1 million annually. He received a significant raise after the 2002 season and earned close to $3 million in the 2004 season, which ended with USC winning the BCS title in January 2005. He agreed to a contract extension in December 2005. His total compensation, including pay and benefits, for the 2007 fiscal year was $4,415,714.

On January 11, 2010, it was reported that Carroll would be leaving USC to coach the Seattle Seahawks. Carroll had told his players the previous evening that he would be resigning his position with the Trojans to become the new head coach of the Seattle Seahawks. According to the Los Angeles Times, Carroll came to agreement with the Seahawks on a 5-year $33 million contract to become head coach.

Accomplishments

As head coach, Pete Carroll led a resurgence of football at the University of Southern California. Carroll was generally regarded as one of the top college football coaches in the country, and has been compared to College Football Hall of Fame coach Knute Rockne. Program highlights under Carroll include:
Two BCS Championship Game appearances: 2005 win over Oklahoma and 2006 loss to Texas
The Associated Press 2003 National Championship
The Associated Press 2004 National Championship
Seven consecutive Associated Press Top-4 finishes
Six BCS bowl victories
Seven consecutive BCS bowl appearances
A national-record 33 consecutive weeks as the Associated Press's No. 1-ranked team
A winning record of 97–19 (83.6%)
A winning record of 14–2 against traditional rivals Notre Dame and UCLA
An NCAA record of 63 straight 20-point games
Twenty-five 1st team All-Americans
53 players selected in the NFL Draft, including 14 in the first round
Three Heisman Trophy winners: Carson Palmer in 2002, Matt Leinart in 2004, and Reggie Bush in 2005 (since vacated)
Four Top-5 recruiting classes
34-game winning streak (2003–04)
Winning streaks for home games (21) and Pac-10 home games (17)
A 25–1 record in the month of November

In July 2007, ESPN.com named USC its #1 team of the decade for the period between 1996 and 2006, primarily citing the Trojans' renaissance and dominance under Carroll. In 2007, his effect on the college football landscape was named one of the biggest developments over the past decade in ESPN the Magazine. In May 2008, Carroll was named the coach who did the most to define the first 10 years of the BCS Era.

In July 2014, Carroll was announced as a member of the 2015 USC Athletic Hall of Fame class.

NCAA sanctions
See University of Southern California athletics scandal.

NCAA ruling
On June 9, 2010, The Los Angeles Times reported that Carroll, along with other active and former USC officials, had appeared in front of a ten-member NCAA Committee on Infractions the previous February. The next day, June 10, the NCAA announced sanctions against the USC football program including a two-year bowl ban, the elimination of thirty football scholarships, and forfeiture of some football victories from 2004 to 2005 (a season which had included winning the Bowl Championship Series title), and all team victories from the undefeated 2005–06 regular season, when USC lost to Texas in the BCS title game. With the vacated games removed, Carroll drops to fourth on USC's all-time wins list, behind John McKay, Howard Jones and John Robinson. His 97 on-field wins would put him ahead of Robinson for third in Trojan history.

The allegations centered on former Trojan star Reggie Bush. Bush was found to have accepted several improper gifts, including the use of a San Diego area home for members of his family. It was reported that USC might appeal the sanctions. These sanctions have been criticized by some NCAA football writers, including ESPN's Ted Miller, who wrote, "It's become an accepted fact among informed college football observers that the NCAA sanctions against USC were a travesty of justice, and the NCAA's refusal to revisit that travesty are  a massive act of cowardice on the part of the organization."

After Carroll announced that he was leaving for the Seahawks, he denied the possibility that the NCAA sanctions were a factor in his leaving USC to return to pro football in Seattle. "Not in any way," Carroll stated, "because I know where we stand. It's just a process we have to go through. We know we've fought hard to do right." Carroll was hired before the sanctions were announced.

Reacting to the USC sanctions in a video produced by his new employers, Carroll said on June 10, 2010, "I'm absolutely shocked and disappointed in the findings of the NCAA." He said in 2014 during a visit to USC, "I thought [the NCAA's investigation into USC] was dealt with poorly and very irrationally and done with way too much emotion instead of facts. I sat in the meetings. I listened to the people talk. I listened to the venom that they had for our program... They tried to make it out like it was something else. They made a terrible error." In 2015, he said, "We had so much success and we had so much fun doing it, it was uncommon for people to understand. ... I think it rubbed people the wrong way. There was such a bitterness."

Reactions
Wrote Los Angeles Times sportswriter Jerry Crowe, "It's somehow apt that the Trojans were asked to return the Grantland Rice Trophy after being stripped of the 2004 Football Writers Assn. of America national championship... Grantland Rice was the legendary early 20th century sportswriter who wrote, 'When the great scorer comes/to mark against your name/He'll write not 'won' or 'lost'/but how you played the game.'"

Among Carroll's critics in the media was longtime Los Angeles Times sportswriter Bill Plaschke, who said that in one stroke, Carroll went

Sporting News writer Mike Florio called for the Seahawks to fire Carroll, saying that "justice won't truly be served until the only coaching Carroll ever does entails holding an Xbox controller."

On August 26, 2010, the Football Writers Association of America announced it would take back USC's 2004 Grantland Rice Trophy and leave that year's award vacant, the only vacancy in the over half century of the history of the award. The FWAA also said it would not consider USC as a candidate for the award for the 2010 season. New USC athletic director Pat Haden said USC would return the trophy, stating, "While we know that some fans and former student-athletes may be disappointed, our central priority at this time is our overall commitment to compliance and this action is in line with the standards we have set for our entire athletic program."

Seattle Seahawks (2010–present)

2010 season
After the Seattle Seahawks fired head coach Jim L. Mora after one season, Carroll was rumored to be in the running for the job. On January 8, 2010, it was reported that Carroll was about to be hired as head coach of the Seahawks; the two parties were hammering out "minor details" in the pending contract. According to the Los Angeles Times, Carroll was "close to reaching an agreement with the Seattle Seahawks on Friday evening." On the morning of January 9, 2010, Carroll reportedly came to agreement with the Seahawks on a five-year contract that would appoint him as head coach. He was officially hired as the Seahawks' head coach on January 11.  He was also named executive vice president of football operations, effectively making him the Seahawks' general manager as well.  While the Seahawks have a general manager in John Schneider, he serves mainly in an advisory role to Carroll, who has the final say in football matters. He is one of three coaches who also has the powers of general manager, along with New England's Bill Belichick and Washington's Ron Rivera.

In his first season, Carroll almost completely overturned the Seahawks roster, totaling over 200 transactions in the course of only one season. However, these moves paved the way for a 4–2 start to the 2010 season. Although Seattle faltered through the latter half of the season, the team beat their NFC West division rival Rams in the final week of the regular season for the division championship, becoming the first 7–9 team in NFL history to win a division title. Carroll made even more history as the Seahawks later upset the then-Super Bowl Champions New Orleans Saints by a score of 41-36 during the Wild Card Round of the playoffs, behind running back Marshawn Lynch and the famed Beast Quake run. However, the following week at Soldier Field in Chicago, Illinois, they then fell to the Chicago Bears, whom they had defeated earlier in the season, in the Divisional Round by a score of 35–24.

2011 season
In 2011, Carroll again coached the Seahawks to a 7–9 record, but it was not enough to secure a playoff spot due to the ascendance of Carroll's old college rival coach Jim Harbaugh and division rival San Francisco 49ers, who finished with a 13–3 record. It was the first season the Seahawks had a starting quarterback other than Matt Hasselbeck in over a decade.

2012 season
In his third season with the Seahawks in 2012, Carroll, along with rookie quarterback Russell Wilson, led the team to an 11–5 record, including going undefeated at home. The 2012 season was Carroll's first winning season for the team. The Seahawks were also involved in controversy during Week 3's Monday Night Football game against the Green Bay Packers in Seattle, when the replacement officials called two different results for Russell Wilson's Hail Mary pass to wide receiver Golden Tate. The officials called the play in the Seahawks' favor, igniting a national outrage about the officiating. When the NFL referee lockout ended several days later, NFL Commissioner Roger Goodell acknowledged that public furor over the call accelerated the eventual resolution of the labor dispute. Carroll's record was enough to post the team's second playoff berth, and the Seahawks won their Wild Card Round game on the road against the Washington Redskins and fellow rookie quarterback Robert Griffin III, 24–14. Seattle lost the following week in the Divisional Round to the Atlanta Falcons at the Georgia Dome by a score of 30–28.

2013 season: Super Bowl XLVIII run

The Seattle Seahawks 2013 season began with four consecutive preseason wins, and odds-makers had distinguished them as the favorite in the NFC. The regular season began with a 12–7 victory at Carolina. The prior year's NFC Champions and divisional rival, the San Francisco 49ers, were blown out by the Seahawks, 29–3. Winning out September, they visited the Colts in Indianapolis and suffered their first loss, on October 6. That was the only loss Carroll, and team, would suffer until December. Heading to San Francisco for their second match-up against their divisional foe, the Seahawks were consensus best in NFC, posting an 11–1 record. However, the game was in stark contrast to their first in September. The 49ers edged out a 19–17 win, yet the Seahawks' then 11–2 record was still best in the conference. The penultimate game, against the Arizona Cardinals, was Seattle's attempt to continue their at-home winning streak to 15 games (record started in Week 2 of the 2012 season). Although the Seahawks had won their three prior meetings, including one earlier in the year, the Cardinals had steadily improved during the season. The at-home win streak did not reach 15. The Cardinals won, and Seattle suffered its third loss of the year. Their regular-season finale, against the St. Louis Rams, established a new at-home streak of one, and Carroll concluded the regular season at 13–3. The number one team (and playoff seed) in the NFC, Carroll matched Mike Holmgren's 2005 season of the same record, tying for the best in Seattle history. The Seahawks defeated the Saints in the Divisional Round of the playoffs by a score of 23-15. In the NFC Championship, cornerback Richard Sherman tipped a Colin Kaepernick pass into the waiting arms of Malcolm Smith to secure a 23-17 win over the 49ers. It was later dubbed the Immaculate Deflection.

On February 2, 2014, Carroll led the Seattle Seahawks to their first Super Bowl win in franchise history after defeating the Denver Broncos, 43–8, in Super Bowl XLVIII. Carroll joined Barry Switzer and Jimmy Johnson as the only coaches to win both an NCAA championship and a Super Bowl. At age 62, Carroll was the third-oldest coach to win a Super Bowl. Tom Coughlin was 65 when his Giants won Super Bowl XLVI and Dick Vermeil was 63 when the St. Louis Rams won Super Bowl XXXIV.

2014 season: Second consecutive NFC championship
The following season, the Seahawks started off their quest to repeat as champions with a 36–16 defeat of the Green Bay Packers on Thursday Night Football in the first game of the NFL season. A Super Bowl XLVIII rematch came in Week 3, with Seattle again defeating Peyton Manning and the Denver Broncos, 26–20 in overtime. However, losses to the San Diego Chargers, Dallas Cowboys, St. Louis Rams, and Kansas City Chiefs caused the defending champions to start the season with a 6–4 record, three games behind the division leading Arizona Cardinals. After a team meeting following a Week 11 loss, the Seahawks finished the regular season 6–0 to finish with a 12–4 record. As the #1 seed in the playoffs, the Seahawks beat the Carolina Panthers in the Divisional Round, 31–17, to get to their second straight NFC Championship. After trailing 19–7 to the Green Bay Packers with just over two minutes remaining in the NFC Championship, the Seahawks launched a furious comeback to force overtime. On the first possession of overtime, Russell Wilson hit wide receiver Jermaine Kearse for a game-winning touchdown that sent the Seahawks to their second straight Super Bowl. On February 1, 2015, Carroll's Seahawks lost Super Bowl XLIX to Carroll's former team, the New England Patriots, 28–24.  With 25 seconds to go on second down and goal at the Patriots' 1-yard line, and the Seahawks trailing by four points, Carroll called for a pass play. Wilson's pass was intercepted by Patriots cornerback Malcolm Butler on the goal line, and the Patriots ran out the clock. Some have called Carroll's play-call on the play "the worst play-call in NFL history."

2015 season
The 2015 offseason was one full of criticism for Carroll, Wilson, and offensive coordinator Darrell Bevell after the ending of Super Bowl XLIX. However, Carroll was praised by much of the national media for how he handled the adversity following the game. The Seahawks began the 2015 season by blowing fourth quarter leads to the St. Louis Rams, Green Bay Packers, Cincinnati Bengals, Carolina Panthers, and Arizona Cardinals. After losing at home on Sunday Night Football to the division leading Cardinals, Seattle sat at 4–5. However, Carroll rejuvenated his team enough to win their next five games, putting the Seahawks at 9–5 and clinching a playoff berth. Russell Wilson became the first quarterback to throw 19 or more touchdown passes without any interceptions over five or more wins. The Seahawks ended the regular season with a revengeful win against Arizona, beating the NFC West champions 36–6 on the road. Seattle entered the postseason as the #6 seed, winning its Wild Card Round against the Minnesota Vikings after Vikings kicker Blair Walsh missed a 27-yard field goal for a final score of 10–9. The Seahawks would later fall to the Carolina Panthers in the Divisional Round 31–24, after being down 31–0 at the half, and as a result, the Seahawks would not reach a third consecutive Super Bowl appearance.

2016 season
On July 25, 2016, Carroll signed a three-year contract extension with the Seahawks that would keep him in Seattle through the 2019 season. Carroll's Seahawks once again had high expectations leading into the 2016 season, but injuries to key players on both sides of the ball eventually became too much to overcome. The Seahawks were able to start the season with a 4–1 record, despite Russell Wilson playing with a hurt ankle sustained in the season opener against the Miami Dolphins. In Week 10, the Seahawks travelled to New England to play the Patriots for the first time since the Super Bowl XLIX loss, and came away with a 31–24 victory to push the Seahawks to 6–2–1. Carroll notched his 100th regular-season win the following week against the Philadelphia Eagles. The Seahawks clinched the NFC West in Week 15, following a 24–3 victory over the Los Angeles Rams. It was Carroll's fourth NFC West division title in his seven seasons with the team, and sixth playoff appearance. In the Wild Card Round, the Seahawks dominated the Detroit Lions in a 26-6 victory. The victory extended Seattle's playoff home game win streak to 10 consecutive wins, 6 of which have come under Carroll. The Seahawks were eliminated in the Divisional Round for the second straight year in 2016, losing 36–20 to the Atlanta Falcons. In his season-ending press conference, Carroll revealed that cornerback Richard Sherman had been playing with a "significant" MCL injury, which attracted attention because Sherman had not been listed on the injury report throughout the season.

2017 season
In his eighth season with the Seahawks, Carroll led the team to a 9–7 record. The team finished second in the NFC West but missed out on the playoffs for only the second time in Carroll's time with the Seahawks.

2018 season
In the 2018 season, Carroll helped lead the Seahawks to a 10–6 record and a second-place finish in the NFC West. The team returned to the playoffs, where they lost 24–22 to the Dallas Cowboys in the Wild Card Round. On October 14, 2018, Carroll reached win number 91 over the Oakland Raiders, becoming the Seahawks' all-time wins leader (including postseason), passing Mike Holmgren with a record of 91–56–1 at that point.

2019 season
On September 15, 2019, which was his 68th birthday, Carroll won his 100th game as the Seahawks head coach, defeating the Pittsburgh Steelers 28–26. Carroll's Seahawks finished the season at 11–5, finishing second in the NFC West behind the 13–3 San Francisco 49ers.

As a fifth seed in the playoffs, the Seahawks defeated the Philadelphia Eagles 17–9 in the Wild Card Round, before being eliminated in the Divisional Round by the Green Bay Packers 28–23. Carroll coached the NFC team in the 2020 Pro Bowl.

2020 season

Carroll was fined  by the NFL for not properly wearing a face mask, as required for coaches during the COVID-19 pandemic, during a Week 2 game in the 2020 NFL season on September 21, 2020. On November 8, 2020, Carroll and the Seahawks agreed to a four-year contract extension. They ended the season with a 12–4 record and won their first division title since 2016, but lost to the Los Angeles Rams in the Wild Card Round.

2021 season 
Carroll and the Seahawks named Rams passing game coordinator Shane Waldron to the offensive coordinator position. Under Waldron, Seattle's offense got off to a hot start, with quarterback Russell Wilson completing 18 of 23 passes for 254 yards and four  touchdowns as the Seahawks won 28–16 to the Indianapolis Colts, finishing with a passer rating of 152.3. The following week against the Tennessee Titans, the Seahawks lost 30–33 in overtime to the Tennessee Titans, after blowing a 30–16 lead in the fourth quarter. In Week 3 against the Minnesota Vikings, the Seahawks raced to a 17–7 lead early in the second quarter before their offense was shut out by the Vikings for the rest of the game; Seattle lost 17–30. In Week 5 against the Los Angeles Rams on Thursday Night Football, quarterback Russell Wilson broke his finger on a sack by Rams defensive tackle Aaron Donald, and he was ruled out as backup Geno Smith relieved him in the 17–26 loss.

Wilson was placed on injured reserve later that same day, missing a start for the first time in his NFL career. Carroll and the Seahawks went 1–2 in Wilson's absence before hitting the bye week. Wilson was activated off injured reserve on November 12 ahead of their game against the Green Bay Packers. Wilson and the Seahawks were blanked in the 0–17 loss for the first time since he became their starting quarterback, completing just 20 of 40 passes for 161 yards and two interceptions.

Carroll's Seahawks rallied to finish the season by winning four of their final six games, with one loss coming by just one point. During the season, the Seahawks' first such losing season since 2011, Carroll candidly admitted to the media that he "probably wouldn't have been here a long time" without his longtime starting quarterback. Despite the disappointing season, it was reported on January 16, 2022, that Carroll and general manager John Schneider would retain their jobs for the 2022 season.

2022 season
In the offseason, Russell Wilson was traded to the Denver Broncos. Carroll later named Geno Smith the starter for the regular season opener, which would be against Wilson and the Broncos. The Seahawks defeated the Broncos 17–16. Carroll led the Seahawks to a 9–8 finish and an appearance in the playoffs. The Seahawks' season ended in the Wild Card Round with a 41–23 loss to the San Francisco 49ers.

Head coaching record

NFL

College

Coaching tree
Carroll has worked under ten head coaches:
Chester Caddas: University of the Pacific (1973-1976)
Lou Holtz: Arkansas Razorbacks (1977)
Earle Bruce: Iowa State Cyclones (1978), Ohio State Buckeyes (1979)
Monte Kiffin: NC State Wolfpack (1980–1982)
Bob Cope: University of the Pacific (1983)
Kay Stephenson: Buffalo Bills (1984)
Bud Grant: Minnesota Vikings (1985)
Jerry Burns: Minnesota Vikings (1986–1989)
Bruce Coslet: New York Jets (1990–1993)
George Seifert: San Francisco 49ers (1995-1996)

Fifteen of Carroll's assistant coaches became NFL or NCAA head coaches:
Walt Harris, Pitt (1997–2004); Stanford (2005–2006)
Nick Holt, Idaho (2004-2005)
Ed Orgeron, Ole Miss (2005–2007); LSU (2017-2021)
Greg Robinson, Syracuse (2005–2008)
Lane Kiffin, Oakland Raiders (2007–2008); Tennessee (2009); USC (2010–2013); Florida Atlantic (2017–2019); Ole Miss (2020-present)
Sparky Woods, VMI (2008–2012)
Bo Pelini, Nebraska (2008–2014); Youngstown State (2015-2019)
Steve Sarkisian, Washington (2009–2013); USC (2014–2015); Texas (2021-present)
DeWayne Walker, New Mexico State (2009-2012)
Norm Chow, Hawaii (2012-2015)
Larry Kennan, Incarnate Word (2012-2017)
Gus Bradley, Jacksonville Jaguars (2013–2016)
Dan Quinn, Atlanta Falcons (2015–2020)
Jedd Fisch, Arizona (2021–present)
Robert Saleh, New York Jets (2021–present)

Six of Carroll's executives became general managers in the NFL:
Charley Armey, St. Louis Rams (2000-2005)
John Idzik Jr., New York Jets (2013-2014)
Jason Licht, Tampa Bay Buccaneers (2014-present)
Scot McCloughan, Washington Redskins (2015-2016)
Chris Grier, Miami Dolphins (2016-present)
Scott Fitterer, Carolina Panthers (2021-present)

Personal awards

2003
2003 American Football Coaches Association Division I-A Coach of the Year
Home Depot National Coach of the Year
Maxwell Club College Coach of the Year
ESPN.com National Coach of the Year
Pigskin Club of Washington, D.C. Coach of the Year
All-American Football Foundation Frank Leahy Co-Coach of the Year
Pac-10 Co-Coach of the Year

2004
2004 National Quarterback Club College Coach of the Year
2004 ESPN.com Pac-10 Coach of the Year

2005
Pac-10 Co-Coach of the Year
United States Sports Academy Amos Alonzo Stagg Coaching Award

2006
Pac-10 Coach of the Year

2014
PFWA's Jack Horrigan Award
ESPY Award for Best Coach (Nominated)

Coaching style
On offense, Carroll is known for using aggressive play-calling that is open to trick plays as well as "going for it" on 4th down instead of punting the ball away. Because of his aggressive style, the USC band gave him the nickname "Big Balls Pete". At USC  home games, when Carroll decided to go for it on 4th down, the USC band would start a chant of "Big Balls Pete" that carried over to the students section and the alumni.

On defense, Carroll favors a bend-but-don't-break scheme of preventing the big plays: allowing opposing teams to get small yardage but trying to keep the plays in front of his defenders.

Carroll draws coaching inspiration from the 1974 book The Inner Game of Tennis by tennis coach W. Timothy Gallwey, which he picked up as graduate student at the University of the Pacific; he summarizes the philosophy he took from the book as "all about clearing the clutter in the interactions between your conscious and subconscious mind", enabled "through superior practice and a clear approach. Focus, clarity and belief in yourself are what allows [sic] you to express your ability without discursive thoughts and concerns." He wrote a foreword for a later edition, noting that athletes "must clear their minds of all confusion and earn the ability to let themselves play freely." He also cites influences from psychologists Abraham Maslow and Carl Jung, Buddhist meditation master Chögyam Trungpa, and Zen master D. T. Suzuki.

After he was fired by the New England Patriots, Carroll read a book by former UCLA basketball coach John Wooden which heavily influenced how he would run his future program at USC: emulating Wooden, Carroll decided to engineer his program in the way that best exemplified his personal philosophy. He decided his philosophy was best summarized as "I'm a competitor". As a fan of the Grateful Dead, Carroll then tied Wooden's thoughts into those by Jerry Garcia, and decided that he wanted his football program to not be the best, but the only program following his competitive philosophy.

Carroll is known for his high-energy and often pleasant demeanor when coaching. In explaining his enthusiasm, Carroll has stated, "I always think something good's just about to happen." In a 2005 interview, Carroll explained his motivation:

Carroll has been known to plan elaborate surprises and pranks during practice to lighten the mood and reward the players; notable examples include using a Halloween practice to stage a fake argument and subsequent falling death of running back LenDale White, having defensive end Everson Griffen arrested by the Los Angeles Police Department during a team meeting for "physically abusing" freshman offensive linemen, and several pranks involving USC alumnus and comedic actor Will Ferrell. During practices, Carroll frequently gets involved doing drills: running sprints and routes as well as throwing the ball. Under Carroll, nearly all USC practices were open to the public, a move that was uncommon among programs; he believed that having fans at practice helped his team prepare, making mundane drills seem more interesting, causing players to perform at a high level when they know they have an audience and preparing them for larger crowds on game days.

Despite his penchant for humor, Carroll's USC program had strictly prescribed routines that covered what players were allowed to eat, the vocabulary they used, and the theme of daily practices. Under his tenure, days had descriptive nicknames like Tell the Truth Monday, Competition Tuesday, Turnover Wednesday.

Carroll favorably compared college recruiting to any other competition, and enjoys the ability to recruit talent, which he was unable to do in the NFL. He likens being a college head coach to being both the "coach and general manager." He assigned all jersey numbers to his players, an assignment he takes seriously. When he was an incoming freshman at Pacific, he wanted No. 40, the number he had worn in all sports growing up; however, Pacific had retired the number in honor of quarterback/safety Eddie LeBaron, so Carroll ended up with 46.

Philanthropy
After moving to Los Angeles, Carroll was affected by the number of gang-related murders taking place in poorer areas. In April 2003, Carroll helped organize a meeting with political leaders, high-ranking law enforcement officials and representatives from social service, education and faith-based communities at USC's Heritage Hall for a brainstorming session. The result was the founding of A Better LA, a charity devoted to reducing violence in targeted urban areas of Los Angeles.

Work with children
In April 2009, Carroll launched CampPete.com, a multi-player online game "billed as a ground-breaking Web site aimed at bringing Coach Carroll's unique Win Forever philosophy to kids all over the country by taking advantage of one of the hottest technology trends online, the virtual world." The site, which can be accessed by creating a virtual avatar, includes arcade-style games, motivational messages from Coach Carroll and a sports trivia section as well as a collection of virtual football skills workshops for kids. A portion of the proceeds from CampPete.com go to support A Better LA.

Personal life
Carroll's wife Glena played volleyball at the University of the Pacific  Together the couple have three children: elder son Brennan, daughter Jaime, and younger son Nate. Both Brennan and Nate have been part of the Seattle Seahawks coaching staff.

Brennan Carroll played tight end at the University of Pittsburgh after transferring from University of Delaware; he graduated from Pitt in 2001 and joined his father as a graduate assistant. Jaime Carroll started attending USC in the fall of 2000, several months before her father was hired as football coach; she was a player on the Women of Troy's women's volleyball team. Nathan Carroll graduated from USC. In 2010, Nathan joined his father as an assistant for the Seahawks.

See also
 List of National Football League head coaches with 50 wins
 List of Super Bowl head coaches

Notes

References

Other sources
Player Bio: Pete Carroll, USC Athletic Department, Accessed August 3, 2006.
Neil Hayes, Carroll Exceeds All Expectations, Contra Costa Times, November 10, 2005, Page b01.
Stewart Mandell, For Pete's sake: Carroll spurs USC's quick rise back to national prominence, CNNSI.com, Dece. 30, 2003.

External links

Coaching statistics at Pro-Football-Reference.com
 
 Seattle Seahawks profile

1951 births
Living people
American football safeties
American people of Croatian descent
American people of Irish descent
Arkansas Razorbacks football coaches
Buffalo Bills coaches
Coaches of American football from California
Iowa State Cyclones football coaches
Marin Mariners football players
Minnesota Vikings coaches
NC State Wolfpack football coaches
New England Patriots head coaches
New York Jets coaches
New York Jets head coaches
Ohio State Buckeyes football coaches
Pacific Tigers football coaches
Pacific Tigers football players
Players of American football from San Francisco
San Francisco 49ers coaches
Seattle Seahawks head coaches
Super Bowl-winning head coaches
USC Trojans football coaches
Redwood High School (Larkspur, California) alumni